The 10th South American Youth Championships in Athletics were held in Lima, Peru, between November 22–24, 1990.

Medal summary
Medal winners are published for boys and girls.  Complete results can be found on the "World Junior Athletics History" website.

Men

Women

Medal table (unofficial)

Participation (unofficial)
Detailed result lists can be found on the "World Junior Athletics History" website.  An unofficial count yields the number of about 196 athletes from about 10 countries:  

 (28)
 (3)
 (55)
 (31)
 (13)
 (13)
 Panama (3)
 (10)
 Peru (35)
 (5)

References

External links
World Junior Athletics History

South American U18 Championships in Athletics
1990 in Peruvian sport
South American U18 Championships
International athletics competitions hosted by Peru
1990 in youth sport